The 1953–54 season was the 70th Scottish football season in which Dumbarton competed at national level, entering the Scottish Football League, the Scottish Cup and the Scottish League Cup.  In addition Dumbarton competed in the Stirlingshire Cup.

Scottish League

After three seasons of mid-table finishes, Dumbarton fell to rock-bottom 16th place, with 22 points, 23 behind champions Motherwell.

In 1949, Division C merged with the Scottish Reserve League to form two regionalised divisions.  Only 'first XI's could be promoted from the newly formatted Division C, and this became an almost impossible task as the smaller teams had to face the 'second strings' of Division A.  It was however to be Dumbarton's fate that this season saw Brechin City win the North-East section of Division C, and so took Dumbarton's place in Division B. So for the first time since 1906, the club would play league football outside the top two divisions.

Scottish Cup

There was another disappointing first round exit in the Cup with Dumbarton losing to Stirling Albion.

Scottish League Cup

Another sectional 'bottom' finish (4th of 4) was recorded in the League Cup, with only a single win and a draw from 6 matches.

Stirlingshire Cup
Dumbarton's disastrous season was completed as their grip on the Stirlingshire Cup was easily released by defeat in the first round to Falkirk.

Dewar Shield
The Dewar Shield was a competition played between the previous season's champions of Aberdeenshire, Forfarshire, Perthshire and Stirlingshire. Dumbarton were drawn to meet the Aberdeenshire Cup holders, Buckie Thistle, but no doubt due to travel costs, Dumbarton withdrew.

Friendlies
Despite being two of the oldest clubs in Scotland, Dumbarton and Stranraer's first XIs met for the first time in two friendly matches.

Player statistics

|}

Source:

Transfers

Players in

Players out 

Source:

Reserve team
Dumbarton only played one official 'reserve' match in the Second XI Cup, losing in the first round to Third Lanark.

References

Dumbarton F.C. seasons
Scottish football clubs 1953–54 season